Tyne and Wear is a metropolitan county in North East England, situated around the mouths of the rivers Tyne and Wear. It was created in 1974, by the Local Government Act 1972, along with five metropolitan boroughs of Gateshead, Newcastle upon Tyne, Sunderland, North Tyneside and South Tyneside. It is bordered by Northumberland to the north and Durham to the south; the county boundary was formerly split between these counties with the border as the River Tyne.

The former county council was based at Sandyford House. There is no longer county level local governance following the county council disbanding in 1986, by the Local Government Act 1985, with the metropolitan boroughs functioning separately. The county still exists as a metropolitan county and ceremonial purposes, as a geographic frame of reference. There are two combined authorities covering parts of the county area, North of Tyne and North East.

History 
In the late 600s and into the 700s Saint Bede lived as a monk at the monastery of St. Peter and of St. Paul writing histories of the Early Middle Ages including the Ecclesiastical History of the English People.

Roughly 150 years ago, in the village of Marsden in South Shields, Souter Lighthouse was built, the first electric structure of this type.

The Local Government Act 1888 constituted Newcastle upon Tyne, Gateshead and Sunderland as county boroughs (Newcastle had "county corporate" status as the "County and Town of Newcastle upon Tyne" since 1400). Tynemouth joined them in 1904. Between the county boroughs, various other settlements also formed part of the administrative counties of Durham and of Northumberland.

The need to reform local government on Tyneside was recognised by the government as early as 1935, when a Royal Commission to Investigate the Conditions of Local Government on Tyneside was appointed. The three commissioners were to
examine the system of local government in the areas of local government north and south of the river Tyne from the sea to the boundary of the Rural District of Castle Ward and Hexham in the County of Northumberland and to the Western boundary of the County of Durham, to consider what changes, if any, should be made in the existing arrangements with a view to securing greater economy and efficiency, and to make recommendations.

The report of the Royal Commission, published in 1937, recommended the establishment of a Regional Council for Northumberland and Tyneside (to be called the "Northumberland Regional Council") to administer services that needed to be exercised over a wide area, with a second tier of smaller units for other local-government purposes. The second-tier units would form by amalgamating the various existing boroughs and districts. The county boroughs in the area would lose their status.  Within this area, a single municipality would be formed covering the four county boroughs of Newcastle, Gateshead, Tynemouth, South Shields and other urban districts and boroughs.

A minority report proposed amalgamation of Newcastle, Gateshead, Wallsend, Jarrow, Felling, Gosforth, Hebburn and Newburn into a single "county borough of Newcastle-on-Tyneside".  The 1937 proposals never came into operation: local authorities could not agree on a scheme and the legislation of the time did not allow central government to compel one.

Tyneside (excluding Sunderland) was a Special Review Area under the Local Government Act 1958.  The Local Government Commission for England came back with a recommendation to create a new county of Tyneside based on the review area, divided into four separate boroughs.  This was not implemented.  The Redcliffe-Maud Report proposed a Tyneside unitary authority, again excluding Sunderland, which would have set up a separate East Durham unitary authority.

The White Paper that led to the Local Government Act 1972 proposed as "area 2" a metropolitan county including Newcastle and Sunderland, extending as far south down the coast as Seaham and Easington, and bordering "area 4" (which would become Tees Valley).  The Bill as presented in November 1971 pruned back the southern edge of the area, and gave it the name "Tyneside".  The name "Tyneside" proved controversial on Wearside, and a government amendment changed the name to "Tyne and Wear" at the request of Sunderland County Borough Council.

Geography 
Tyne and Wear either has or closely borders two official Met Office stations, neither located in one of the major urban centres. There are some clear differences between the stations temperature and precipitation patterns even though both have a cool-summer and mild-winter oceanic climate.

Green belt 

Tyne and Wear contains green belt interspersed throughout the county, mainly on the fringes of the Tyneside/Wearside conurbation. There is also an inter-urban line of belt helping to keep the districts of South Tyneside, Gateshead, and Sunderland separated. It was first drawn up from the 1950s. All the county's districts contain some portion of belt.

Governance 

Although Tyne and Wear County Council was abolished in 1986, several joint bodies exist to run certain services on a county-wide basis. Most notable is the Tyne and Wear Passenger Transport Authority, which co-ordinates transport policy. Through its passenger transport executive, known as Nexus, it owns and operates the Tyne and Wear Metro light rail system, and the Shields ferry service and the Tyne Tunnel, linking communities on either side of the River Tyne. Also through Nexus, the authority subsidises socially necessary transport services (including taxis) and operates a concessionary fares scheme for the elderly and disabled.  Nexus has been an executive body of the North East Joint Transport Committee since November 2018.

Other joint bodies include the Tyne and Wear Fire and Rescue Service and Tyne & Wear Archives & Museums, which was created from the merger of the Tyne and Wear Archives Service and Tyne and Wear Museums. These joint bodies are administered by representatives of all five of the constituent councils. In addition the Northumbria Police force covers Northumberland and Tyne and Wear.

There have been occasional calls for Tyne and Wear to be abolished and the traditional border between Northumberland and County Durham to be restored.

Tyne and Wear is divided into 12 Parliamentary constituencies. Historically, the area has been a Labour stronghold; South Shields is the only Parliamentary constituency that has never returned a Conservative Member of Parliament (MP) to the House of Commons since the Reform Act of 1832.

At the level of local government, all of the region's five unitary authorities were controlled by Labour in 2019.

Newcastle and Sunderland are known for declaring their election results early on election night. Therefore, they frequently give the first indication of nationwide trends. An example of this was at the 2016 European Union referendum. Newcastle was the first large city to declare, and 50.6% of voters voted to Remain; this proportion was far lower than predicted by experts. Sunderland declared soon after and gave a 62% vote to Leave, much higher than expected. These two results were seen as an early sign that the United Kingdom had voted to Leave.

Settlements 

Italics indicate the district centre.
For a complete list of all villages, towns and cities see the list of places in Tyne and Wear.

Places of interest 
 Gateshead
 Angel of the North
 Beamish Museum, which straddles the Gateshead/County Durham boundary
 BALTIC Centre for Contemporary Art
 Dunston Staiths
 Gateshead International Stadium
 Gateshead Millennium Bridge
 Gibside
 MetroCentre
 Saltwell Park
 Shipley Art Gallery
 Tanfield Railway, Sunniside (crosses boundary into County Durham)
 The Sage Gateshead
 Tyne Bridge (Shared with Newcastle upon Tyne)
 Newcastle upon Tyne
 Discovery Museum (previously Museum of Science & Engineering)
 Hadrian's Wall
 Hancock Museum
 Jesmond Dene public park
 Newcastle Castle Keep
 St James' Park
 Leazes Park
 Centre for Life
 Town Moor
 Tyneside cinema
 Chinatown, Newcastle
 Quayside
 Utilita Arena Newcastle
 Newcastle Cathedral
 Laing Art Gallery
 Theatre Royal
 Northumberland Street
 Grey Street
 Grey's Monument
 The Biscuit Factory
 Tyne Bridge (Shared with Gateshead)
 North Tyneside
 Segedunum Roman Fort & Museum, Wallsend
 St Mary's Island bird reserve
 Tynemouth Castle
 South Tyneside
 Arbeia Roman Fort & Museum, South Shields
 Marsden Rock bird reserve
 Souter Point Lighthouse
 Bede's World, Jarrow
 Sunderland
 The Museum and Winter Gardens
 Mowbray Park
 Seaburn Beach and Roker Beach
 Barnes Park
 The National Glass
 Hylton Castle
 Penshaw Monument
 St. Peter's Church
 Sunderland Minster
 Stadium of Light
 The Empire Theatre
 Northern Gallery for Contemporary Art

Businesses 

Offshore Group Newcastle make oil platforms. Sage Group, who produce accounting software, are based at Hazlerigg at the northern end of the Newcastle bypass. Northern Rock, which became a bank in 1997 and was taken over by Virgin Money in November 2011, and the Newcastle Building Society are based in Gosforth. The Gosforth-based bakery Greggs now has over 1,500 shops. The Balliol Business Park in Longbenton contains Procter & Gamble research and global business centres and a tax credits call centre for HMRC, and is the former home of Findus UK.

Be-Ro and the Go-Ahead Group bus company are in central Newcastle. Nestlé use the former Rowntrees chocolate factory on the east of the A1. BAE Systems Land & Armaments in Scotswood, formerly Vickers-Armstrongs, is the main producer of British Army tanks such as the Challenger 2. A Rolls-Royce apprentice training site is next door. Siemens Energy Service Fossil make steam turbines at the CA Parsons Works in South Heaton. Sir Charles Parsons invented the steam turbine in 1884, and developed an important local company. Domestos, a product whose main ingredient is sodium hypochlorite, was originated in Newcastle in 1929 by William Handley, and was distributed from the area for many years.

Clarke Chapman is next to the A167 in Gateshead. The MetroCentre, the largest shopping centre in Europe, is in Dunston. Scottish & Newcastle was the largest UK-owned brewery until it was bought by Heineken and Carlsberg in April 2008, and produced Newcastle Brown Ale at the Newcastle Federation Brewery in Dunston until production moved to Tadcaster in September 2010. At Team Valley are De La Rue, with their largest banknote printing facility, and Myson Radiators, the second largest in the UK market. Petards make surveillance equipment including ANPR cameras, and its Joyce-Loebl division makes electronic warfare systems and countermeasure dispensing systems such as the AN/ALE-47. Sevcon, an international company formed from a part of Smith Electric, is a world leader in electric vehicle controls. AEI Cables and Komatsu UK construction equipment at Birtley.

J. Barbour & Sons make outdoor clothing in Simonside, Jarrow. SAFT Batteries make primary lithium batteries on the Tyne in South Shields. Bellway plc houses is in Seaton Burn in North Tyneside. Cobalt Business Park, the largest office park in the UK, is at Wallsend, on the former site of Atmel, and is the home of North Tyneside Council. Swan Hunter until 2006 made ships in Wallsend, and still designs ships. Soil Machine Dynamics in Wallsend on the Tyne makes Remotely operated underwater vehicles, and its Ultra Trencher 1 is the world's largest submersible robot.

The car dealership Evans Halshaw is in Sunderland. The car factory owned by Nissan Motor Manufacturing UK between North Hylton and Washington is the largest in the UK. Grundfos, the world's leading pump manufacturer, builds pumps in Sunderland. Calsonic Kansei UK, formerly Magna, make automotive instrument panels and car trim at the Pennywell Industrial Estate. Gestamp UK make automotive components. Smith Electric Vehicles originated in Washington. The LG Electronics microwave oven factory opened in 1989, closed in May 2004, and later became the site of the Tanfield Group. Goodyear Dunlop had their only UK car tyre factory next to the Tanfield site until its 2006 closure. BAE Systems Global Combat Systems moved to a new £75 million factory at the former Goodyear site in 2011, where they make large calibre ammunition for tanks and artillery.

The government's child benefit office is in Washington. Liebherr build cranes next to the Wear at Deptford. The outdoor clothing company Berghaus is in Castletown. Vaux Breweries, who owned Swallow Hotels, closed in 1999. ScS Sofas are on Borough Road. There are many call centres in Sunderland, notably EDF Energy at the Doxford International Business Park, which is also the home of the headquarters of the large international transport company Arriva and Nike UK. Rolls-Royce planned to move their production of fan and turbine discs to BAE Systems' new site in 2016.

See also 
 List of Lord Lieutenants of Tyne and Wear
 List of High Sheriffs of Tyne and Wear
 Tyne–Wear derby

References

External links 

 Images of Tyne and Wear at the English Heritage Archive
 

 
Metropolitan counties
NUTS 2 statistical regions of the United Kingdom
Counties of England established in 1974